Early Christianity (up to the First Council of Nicaea in 325) spread from the Levant, across the Roman Empire, and beyond. Originally, this progression was closely connected to already established Jewish centers in the Holy Land and the Jewish diaspora. The first followers of Christianity were Jews who had converted to the faith, i.e. Jewish Christians.

The Apostolic sees claim to have been founded by one or more of the apostles of Jesus, who are said to have dispersed from Jerusalem sometime after the crucifixion of Jesus, c. 26–36, perhaps following the Great Commission. Early Christians gathered in small private homes, known as house churches, but a city's whole Christian community would also be called a church – the Greek noun ἐκκλησία (ekklesia) literally means assembly, gathering, or congregation but is translated as church in most English translations of the New Testament.

Many early Christians were merchants and others who had practical reasons for traveling to North Africa, Asia Minor, Arabia, the Balkans and other places. Over 40 such communities were established by the year 100, many in Anatolia, also known as Asia Minor, such as the Seven churches of Asia. By the end of the first century, Christianity had already spread to Rome, Armenia, Greece and Syria, serving as foundations for the expansive spread of Christianity, eventually throughout the world.

Eastern Roman Empire

Jerusalem

Jerusalem was the first center of the Christian Church according to the Book of Acts, and according to the Catholic Encyclopedia, the location of "the first Christian church". The apostles lived and taught there for some time after Pentecost.

In , Barnabas and Paul went to Jerusalem to meet with the "Pillars of the Church": James the Just, Peter, and John. Later called the Council of Jerusalem, according to Pauline Christians, this meeting (among other things) confirmed the legitimacy of the Evangelizing mission of Barnabas and Paul to the Gentiles and the Gentile converts' freedom from most of the Mosaic Law, especially from the circumcision of males, a practice that was considered execrable and repulsive in the Greco-Roman world during the period of Hellenization of the Eastern Mediterranean, and was especially adversed in Classical civilization both from ancient Greeks and Romans, which instead valued the foreskin positively. The resulting Apostolic Decree in Acts 15 may simply parallel the seven Noahide laws found in the Old Testament, and thus be a commonality rather than a differential. However, modern scholars dispute the connection between Acts 15 and the seven Noahide laws. In roughly the same time period, rabbinic Jewish legal authorities made their circumcision requirement for Jewish boys even stricter.

The primary issue which was addressed related to the requirement of circumcision, as the author of Acts relates, but other important matters arose as well, as the Apostolic Decree indicates. The dispute was between those, such as the followers of the "Pillars of the Church", led by James, who believed, following his interpretation of the Great Commission, that the church must observe the Torah, i.e. the rules of traditional Judaism, and Paul the Apostle, who called himself "Apostle to the Gentiles", who believed there was no such necessity. The main concern for the Apostle Paul, which he subsequently expressed in greater detail with his letters directed to the early Christian communities in Asia Minor, was the inclusion of Gentiles into God's New Covenant, sending the message that faith in Christ is sufficient for salvation. (See also: Supersessionism, New Covenant, Antinomianism, Hellenistic Judaism, and Paul the Apostle and Judaism). When Peter left Jerusalem after Herod Agrippa I tried to kill him, James appears as the principal authority of the early Christian church. Clement of Alexandria called him Bishop of Jerusalem. A 2nd-century church historian, Hegesippus, wrote that the Sanhedrin martyred him in 62 AD.

In 66 AD, the Jews revolted against Rome. After a brutal siege, Jerusalem fell in 70 AD. The city, including the Jewish Temple, was destroyed and the population was mostly killed or removed. According to a tradition recorded by Eusebius and Epiphanius of Salamis, the Jerusalem church fled to Pella at the outbreak of the First Jewish Revolt. According to Epiphanius of Salamis, the Cenacle survived at least to Hadrian's visit in 130 AD. A scattered population survived. The Sanhedrin relocated to Jamnia. Prophecies of the Second Temple's destruction are found in the synoptics, specifically in the Olivet Discourse.

In the 2nd century, Roman Emperor Hadrian rebuilt Jerusalem as a Pagan city and renamed it Aelia Capitolina, erecting statues of Jupiter and himself on the site of the former Jewish Temple, the Temple Mount. In the years 132–136 AD, Bar Kokhba led an unsuccessful revolt as a Jewish Messiah claimant, but Christians refused to acknowledge him as such. When Bar Kokhba was defeated, Hadrian barred Jews from the city, except for the day of Tisha B'Av, thus the subsequent Jerusalem bishops were Gentiles ("uncircumcised") for the first time.

The general significance of Jerusalem to Christians entered a period of decline during the persecution of Christians in the Roman Empire. According to the Catholic Encyclopedia, it is traditionally believed the Jerusalem Christians waited out the Jewish–Roman wars (66–135 AD) in Pella in the Decapolis. Jerusalem's bishops became suffragans (subordinates) of the Metropolitan bishop in nearby Caesarea, Interest in Jerusalem resumed with the pilgrimage of the Roman Empress Helena to the Holy Land. According to the church historian Socrates of Constantinople, Helena (with the assistance of Bishop Macarius of Jerusalem) claimed to have found the cross of Christ, after removing a Temple to Venus (attributed to Hadrian) that had been built over the site. Jerusalem had received special recognition in Canon VII of the First Council of Nicaea in 325 AD. The traditional founding date for the Brotherhood of the Holy Sepulchre (which guards the Christian Holy places in the Holy Land) is 313, which corresponds with the date of the Edict of Milan promulgated by the Roman Emperor Constantine the Great, which legalized Christianity in the Roman Empire. Jerusalem was later named as one of the Pentarchy, but this was never accepted by the Church of Rome. (See also: East–West Schism#Prospects for reconciliation).

Antioch

Antioch, a major center of Hellenistic Greece, and the third-most important city of the Roman Empire, then part of Syria Province, today a ruin near Antakya, Turkey, was where Christians were first called Christians and also the location of the Incident at Antioch. It was the site of an early church, traditionally said to be founded by Peter who is considered the first bishop. The Gospel of Matthew and the Apostolic Constitutions may have been written there. The church father Ignatius of Antioch was its third bishop. The School of Antioch, founded in 270, was one of two major centers of early church learning. The Curetonian Gospels and the Syriac Sinaiticus are two early (pre-Peshitta) New Testament text types associated with Syriac Christianity. It was one of the three whose bishops were recognized at the First Council of Nicaea (325) as exercising jurisdiction over the adjoining territories.

Alexandria

Alexandria, in the Nile delta, was established by Alexander the Great. Its famous libraries were a center of Hellenistic learning. The Septuagint translation of the Old Testament began there and the Alexandrian text-type is recognized by scholars as one of the earliest New Testament types. It had a significant Jewish population, of which Philo of Alexandria is probably its most known author. It produced superior scripture and notable church fathers, such as Clement, Origen, and Athanasius; also noteworthy were the nearby Desert Fathers. By the end of the era, Alexandria, Rome, and Antioch were accorded authority over nearby metropolitans. The Council of Nicaea in canon VI affirmed Alexandria's traditional authority over Egypt, Libya, and Pentapolis (North Africa) (the Diocese of Egypt) and probably granted Alexandria the right to declare a universal date for the observance of Easter (see also Easter controversy). Some postulate, however, that Alexandria was not only a center of Christianity, but was also a center for Christian-based Gnostic sects.

Asia Minor

The tradition of John the Apostle was strong in Anatolia (the near-east, part of modern Turkey, the western part was called the Roman province of Asia). The authorship of the Johannine works traditionally and plausibly occurred in Ephesus, c. 90–110, although some scholars argue for an origin in Syria.   According to the New Testament, the Apostle Paul was from Tarsus (in south-central Anatolia) and his missionary journeys were primarily in Anatolia. The Book of Revelation, believed to be authored by John of Patmos (a Greek island about 30 miles off the Anatolian coast), mentions Seven churches of Asia. The First Epistle of Peter is addressed to Anatolian regions. On the southeast shore of the Black Sea, Pontus was a Greek colony mentioned three times in the New Testament.  Inhabitants of Pontus were some of the very first converts to Christianity.  Pliny, governor in 110, in his letters, addressed Christians in Pontus. Of the extant letters of Ignatius of Antioch considered authentic, five of seven are to Anatolian cities, the sixth is to Polycarp. Smyrna was home to Polycarp, the bishop who reportedly knew the Apostle John personally, and probably also to his student Irenaeus. Papias of Hierapolis is also believed to have been a student of John the Apostle. In the 2nd century, Anatolia was home to Quartodecimanism, Montanism, Marcion of Sinope, and Melito of Sardis who recorded an early Christian Biblical canon. After the Crisis of the Third Century, Nicomedia became the capital of the Eastern Roman Empire in 286. The Synod of Ancyra was held in 314. In 325 the emperor Constantine convoked the first Christian ecumenical council in Nicaea and in 330 moved the capital of the reunified empire to Byzantium (also an early Christian center and just across the Bosphorus from Anatolia, later called Constantinople), referred to as the Byzantine Empire, which lasted till 1453. The First seven Ecumenical Councils were held either in Western Anatolia or across the Bosphorus in Constantinople.

Caesarea

Caesarea, on the seacoast just northwest of Jerusalem, at first Caesarea Maritima, then after 133 Caesarea Palaestina, was built by Herod the Great, c. 25–13 BC, and was the capital of Iudaea Province (6–132) and later Palaestina Prima. It was there that Peter baptized the centurion Cornelius, considered the first gentile convert. Paul sought refuge there, once staying at the house of Philip the Evangelist, and later being imprisoned there for two years (estimated to be 57–59). The Apostolic Constitutions (7.46) state that the first Bishop of Caesarea was Zacchaeus the Publican but the Catholic Encyclopedia claims that: "...there is no record of any bishops of Caesarea until the second century. At the end of this century a council was held there to regulate the celebration of Easter." According to another Catholic Encyclopedia article, after Hadrian's siege of Jerusalem (c. 133), Caesarea became the metropolitan see with the bishop of Jerusalem as one of its "suffragans" (subordinates). Origen (d. 254) compiled his Hexapla there and it held a famous library and theological school, St. Pamphilus (d. 309) was a noted scholar-priest. St. Gregory the Wonder-Worker (d. 270), St. Basil the Great (d. 379), and St. Jerome (d. 420) visited and studied at the library which was later destroyed, probably by the Persians in 614 or the Saracens around 637. The first major church historian, Eusebius of Caesarea, was a bishop, c. 314–339. F. J. A. Hort and Adolf von Harnack have argued that the Nicene Creed originated in Caesarea. The Caesarean text-type is recognized by many textual scholars as one of the earliest New Testament types.

Cyprus

Paphos was the capital of the island of Cyprus during the Roman years and seat of a Roman commander. In 45 AD, the apostles Paul and Barnabas (according to the Catholic Encyclopedia "a native of the island") came to Cyprus and reached Paphos preaching the Word of Christ, see also . According to Acts, the apostles were persecuted by the Romans but eventually succeeded in convincing the Roman commander Sergius Paulus to renounce his old religion in favour of Christianity.  Barnabas is traditionally identified as the founder of the Cypriot Orthodox Church.

Damascus

Damascus is the capital of Syria and claims to be the oldest continuously inhabited city in the world. According to the New Testament, the Apostle Paul was converted on the Road to Damascus. In the three accounts, he is described as being led by those he was traveling with, blinded by the light, to Damascus where his sight was restored by a disciple called Ananias (who, according to the Catholic Encyclopedia, is thought to have been the first Bishop of Damascus) then he was baptized.

Greece

Thessalonica, the major northern Greek city where it is believed Christianity was founded by Paul, thus an Apostolic See, and the surrounding regions of Macedonia, Thrace, and Epirus, which also extend into the neighboring Balkan states of Albania and Bulgaria, were early centers of Christianity. Of note are Paul's Epistles to the Thessalonians and to Philippi, which is often considered the first contact of Christianity with Europe. The Apostolic Father Polycarp wrote a letter to the Philippians, c. 125.

Nicopolis was a city in the Roman province of Epirus Vetus, today a ruin on the northern part of the western Greek coast. According to the Catholic Encyclopedia: "St. Paul intended going there and it is possible that even then it numbered some Christians among its population; Origen (c. 185–254) sojourned there for a while (Eusebius, Church History VI.16)."

Ancient Corinth, today a ruin near modern Corinth in southern Greece, was an early center of Christianity. According to the Catholic Encyclopedia: "St. Paul preached successfully at Corinth, where he lived in the house of Aquila and Priscilla, where Silas and Timothy soon joined him. After his departure he was replaced by Apollo, who had been sent from Ephesus by Priscilla. The Apostle visited Corinth at least once more. He wrote to the Corinthians in 57 from Ephesus, and then from Macedonia in the same year, or in 58. The famous letter of St. Clement of Rome to the Corinthian church (about 96) exhibits the earliest evidence concerning the ecclesiastical primacy of the Roman Church. Besides St. Apollo, Lequien (II, 155) mentions forty-three bishops: among them, St. Sosthenes (?), the disciple of St. Paul, St. Dionysius; Paul, brother of St. Peter ..."

Athens, the capital and largest city in Greece, was visited by Paul. According to the Catholic Encyclopedia: Paul "came to Athens from Berœa of Macedonia, coming probably by water and landing in the Peiræevs, the harbour of Athens. This was about the year 53. Having arrived at Athens, he at once sent for Silas and Timotheos who had remained behind in Berœa. While awaiting the coming of these he tarried in Athens, viewing the idolatrous city, and frequenting the synagogue; for there were already Jews in Athens. ... It seems that a Christian community was rapidly formed, although for a considerable time it did not possess a numerous membership. The commoner tradition names the Areopagite as the first head and bishop of the Christian Athenians. Another tradition, however, gives this honour to Hierotheos the Thesmothete. The successors of the first bishop were not all Athenians by lineage. They are catalogued as Narkissos, Publius, and Quadratus. Narkissos is stated to have come from Palestine, and Publius from Malta. In some lists Narkissos is omitted. Quadratus is revered for having contributed to early Christian literature by writing an apology, which he addressed to the Emperor Hadrian. This was on the occasion of Hadrian's visit to Athens. Aristeides dedicated an apology to the emperor Hadrian around CE 134. Athenagoras also wrote an apology. In the second century there must have been a considerable community of Christians in Athens, for Hygeinos, Bishop of Rome, is said to have written a letter to the community in the year 139."

Gortyn on Crete was allied with Rome and was thus made capital of Roman Creta et Cyrenaica. St. Titus is believed to have been the first bishop. The city was sacked by the pirate Abu Hafs in 828.

Thrace
Paul the Apostle preached in Macedonia, and also in Philippi, located in Thrace on the Thracian Sea coast. According to Hippolytus of Rome, Andrew the Apostle preached in Thrace, on the Black Sea coast and along the lower course of the Danube River. The spread of Christianity among the Thracians and the emergence of centers of Christianity like Serdica (present day Sofia), Philippopolis (present day Plovdiv) and Durostorum (present day Silistra) was likely to have begun with these early Apostolic missions. The first Christian monastery in Europe was founded in Thrace in 344 by Saint Athanasius near modern-day Chirpan, Bulgaria, following the Council of Serdica.

Libya

Cyrene and the surrounding region of Cyrenaica or the North African "Pentapolis", south of the Mediterranean from Greece, the northeastern part of modern Libya, was a Greek colony in North Africa later converted to a Roman province. In addition to Greeks and Romans, there was also a significant Jewish population, at least up to the Kitos War (115–117). According to the Catholic Encyclopedia: "Lequien mentions six bishops of Cyrene, and according to Byzantine legend the first was St. Lucius (Acts 13:1); St. Theodorus suffered martyrdom under Diocletian;" (284–305).

Western Roman Empire

Rome

Exactly when Christians first appeared in Rome is difficult to determine. The Acts of the Apostles claims that the Jewish Christian couple Priscilla and Aquila had recently come from Rome to Corinth when, in about the year 50, Paul reached the latter city, indicating that belief in Jesus in Rome had preceded Paul.

Historians consistently consider Peter and Paul to have been martyred in Rome under the reign of Nero in 64, after the Great Fire of Rome which, according to Tacitus, the Emperor blamed on the Christians. In the second century Irenaeus of Lyons, reflecting the ancient view that the church could not be fully present anywhere without a bishop, recorded that Peter and Paul had been the founders of the Church in Rome and had appointed Linus as bishop.

However, Irenaeus does not say that either Peter or Paul was "bishop" of the Church in Rome and several historians have questioned whether Peter spent much time in Rome before his martyrdom. While the church in Rome was already flourishing when Paul wrote his Epistle to the Romans to them from Corinth (c. 58) he attests to a large Christian community already there and greets some fifty people in Rome by name, but not Peter whom he knew. Most likely he did not spend any major time at Rome before 58 when Paul wrote to the Romans, and so it may have been only in the 60s and relatively shortly before his martyrdom that Peter came to the capital.

Oscar Cullmann sharply rejected the claim that Peter began the papal succession, and concludes that while Peter was the original head of the apostles, Peter was not the founder of any visible church succession.

The original seat of Roman imperial power soon became a center of church authority, grew in power decade by decade, and was recognized during the period of the Seven Ecumenical Councils, when the seat of government had been transferred to Constantinople, as the "head" of the church.

Rome and Alexandria, which by tradition held authority over sees outside their own province, were not yet referred to as patriarchates.

The earliest Bishops of Rome were all Greek-speaking, the most notable of them being: Pope Clement I (c. 88–97), author of an Epistle to the Church in Corinth; Pope Telesphorus (c. 126–136), probably the only martyr among them; Pope Pius I (c. 141–154), said by the Muratorian fragment to have been the brother of the author of the Shepherd of Hermas; and Pope Anicetus (c. 155–160), who received Saint Polycarp and discussed with him the dating of Easter.

Pope Victor I (189–198) was the first ecclesiastical writer known to have written in Latin; however, his only extant works are his encyclicals, which would naturally have been issued in both Latin and Greek.

Greek New Testament texts were translated into Latin early on, well before Jerome, and are classified as the Vetus Latina and Western text-type.

During the 2nd century, Christians and semi-Christians of diverse views congregated in Rome, notably Marcion and Valentinius, and in the following century there were schisms connected with Hippolytus of Rome and Novatian.

The Roman church survived various persecutions. Among the prominent Christians executed as a result of their refusal to perform acts of worship to the Roman gods as ordered by  emperor Valerian in 258 were Cyprian, bishop of Carthage. The last and most severe of the imperial persecutions was that under Diocletian in 303; they  ended in Rome, and the West in general, with the accession of Maxentius in 306.

Carthage

Carthage, in the Roman province of Africa, south of the Mediterranean from Rome, gave the early church the Latin fathers Tertullian (c. 120 – c. 220) and Cyprian (d. 258).  Carthage fell to Islam in 698.

The Church of Carthage thus was to the Early African church what the Church of Rome was to the Catholic Church in Italy. The archdiocese used the African Rite, a variant of the Western liturgical rites in Latin language, possibly a local use of the primitive Roman Rite. Famous figures include Saint Perpetua, Saint Felicitas, and their Companions (died c. 203), Tertullian (c. 155–240), Cyprian  (c. 200–258), Caecilianus (floruit 311), Saint Aurelius (died 429), and Eugenius of Carthage (died 505). Tertullian and Cyprian are both considered Latin Church Fathers of the Latin Church. Tertullian, a theologian of part Berber descent, was instrumental in the development of trinitarian theology, and was the first to apply Latin language extensively in his theological writings. As such, Tertullian has been called "the father of Latin Christianity" and "the founder of Western theology." Carthage remained an important center of Christianity, hosting several councils of Carthage.

Southern Gaul

The Mediterranean coast of France and the Rhone valley, then part of Roman Gallia Narbonensis, were early centers of Christianity. Major Christian communities were found in Arles, Avignon, Vienne, Lyon, and Marseille (the oldest city in France). The Persecution in Lyon occurred in 177. The Apostolic Father Irenaeus from Smyrna of Anatolia was Bishop of Lyon near the end of the 2nd century and he claimed Saint Pothinus was his predecessor. The Council of Arles in 314 is considered a forerunner of the ecumenical councils. The Ephesine theory attributes the Gallican Rite to Lyon.

Italy outside Rome

Aquileia

The ancient Roman city of Aquileia at the head of the Adriatic Sea, today one of the main archaeological sites of Northern Italy, was an early center of Christianity said to be founded by Mark before his mission to Alexandria. Hermagoras of Aquileia is believed to be its first bishop. The Aquileian Rite is associated with Aquileia.

Milan

It is believed that the Church of Milan in northwest Italy was founded by the apostle Barnabas in the 1st century. Gervasius and Protasius and others were martyred there. It has long maintained its own rite known as the Ambrosian Rite attributed to Ambrose (born c. 330) who was bishop in 374–397 and one of the most influential ecclesiastical figures of the 4th century. Duchesne argues that the Gallican Rite originated in Milan.

Syracuse and Calabria

Syracuse was founded by Greek colonists in 734 or 733 BC, part of Magna Graecia. According to the Catholic Encyclopedia: "Syracuse claims to be the second Church founded by St. Peter, after that of Antioch. It also claims that St. Paul preached there. ... In the times of St. Cyprian (the middle of the third century), Christianity certainly flourished at Syracuse, and the catacombs clearly show that this was the case in the second century." Across the Strait of Messina, Calabria on the mainland was also probably an early center of Christianity.

Malta

According to Acts, Paul was shipwrecked and ministered on an island which some scholars have identified as Malta (an island just south of Sicily) for three months during which time he is said to have been bitten by a poisonous viper and survived, an event usually dated c. AD 60. Paul had been allowed passage from Caesarea Maritima to Rome by Porcius Festus, procurator of Iudaea Province, to stand trial before the Emperor. Many traditions are associated with this episode, and catacombs in Rabat testify to an Early Christian community on the islands. According to  tradition, Publius, the Roman Governor of Malta at the time of Saint Paul's shipwreck, became the first Bishop of Malta following his conversion to Christianity.  After ruling the Maltese Church for thirty-one years, Publius was transferred to the See of Athens in 90 AD, where he was martyred in 125 AD.  There is scant information about the continuity of Christianity in Malta in subsequent years, although tradition has it that there was a continuous line of bishops from the days of St. Paul to the time of Emperor Constantine.

Salona

Salona, the capital of the Roman province of Dalmatia on the eastern shore of the Adriatic Sea, was an early center of Christianity and today is a ruin in modern Croatia. According to the Catholic Encyclopedia it was where: "...Titus the pupil of St. Paul preached, where the followers of Jesus Christ first shed their blood as martyrs, and where beautiful examples of basilicas and other early Christian sculpture have been discovered." According to the Catholic Encyclopedia article on Dalmatia: "Salona became the centre from which Christianity spread. In Pannonia St. Andronicus founded the See of Syrmium (Mitrovica) and later those of Siscia and Mursia. The cruel persecution under Diocletian, who was a Dalmatian by birth, left numerous traces in Old Dalmatia and Pannonia. St. Quirinus, Bishop of Siscia, died a martyr A.D. 303. St. Jerome was born in Strido, a city on the border of Pannonia and Dalmatia."

Seville

Seville was the capital of Hispania Baetica or the Roman province of southern Spain. According to the Catholic Encyclopedia: "...the origin of the diocese goes back to Apostolic times, or at least to the first century of our era. St. Gerontius, Bishop of Italica (about four miles from Hispalis or Seville), preached in Baetica in Apostolic times, and without doubt must have left a pastor of its own to Seville. It is certain that in 303, when Sts. Justa and Rufina, the potters, suffered martyrdom for refusing to adore the idol Salambo, there was a Bishop of Seville, Sabinus, who assisted at the Council of Illiberis (287). Before that time Marcellus had been bishop, as appears from a catalogue of the ancient prelates of Seville preserved in the 'Codex Emilianensis', a manuscript of the year 1000, now in the Escorial. When Constantine brought peace to the Church [313] Evodius was Bishop of Seville; he set himself to rebuild the ruined churches, among them he appears to have built the church of San Vicente, perhaps the first cathedral of Seville."  Early Christianity also spread from the Iberian peninsula south across the Strait of Gibraltar into Roman Mauretania Tingitana, of note is Marcellus of Tangier who was martyred in 298.

Roman Britain

Christianity reached Roman Britain by the third century of the Christian era, the first recorded martyrs in Britain being St. Alban of Verulamium and Julius and Aaron of Caerleon, during the reign of Diocletian (284–305). Gildas dated the faith's arrival to the latter part of the reign of Tiberius, although stories connecting it with Joseph of Arimathea, Lucius, or Fagan are now generally considered pious forgeries. Restitutus, Bishop of London, is recorded as attending the 314 Council of Arles, along with the Bishop of Lincoln and Bishop of York.

Christianisation intensified and evolved into Celtic Christianity after the Romans left Britain c. 410.

Outside the Roman Empire

Christianity also spread beyond the Roman Empire during the early Christian period.

Armenia

It is accepted that Armenia became the first country to adopt Christianity as its state religion. Although it has long been claimed that Armenia was the first Christian kingdom, according to some scholars this has relied on a source by Agathangelos titled "The History of the Armenians", which has recently been redated, casting some doubt.

Christianity became the official religion of Armenia in 301, when it was still illegal in the Roman Empire. According to church tradition, the Armenian Apostolic Church was founded by Gregory the Illuminator of the late third – early fourth centuries while they trace their origins to the missions of Bartholomew the Apostle and Thaddeus (Jude the Apostle) in the 1st century.

Georgia
According to Orthodox tradition, Christianity was first preached in Georgia by the Apostles Simon and Andrew in the 1st century. It became the state religion of Kartli (Iberia) in 319. The conversion of Kartli to Christianity is credited to a Greek lady called St. Nino of Cappadocia. The Georgian Orthodox Church, originally part of the Church of Antioch, gained its autocephaly and developed its doctrinal specificity progressively between the 5th and 10th centuries. The Bible was also translated into Georgian in the 5th century, as the Georgian alphabet was developed for that purpose.

India

According to Eusebius' record, the apostles Thomas and Bartholomew were assigned to Parthia (modern Iran) and India. By the time of the establishment of the Second Persian Empire (AD 226), there were bishops of the Church of the East in northwest India, Afghanistan and Baluchistan (including parts of Iran, Afghanistan, and Pakistan), with laymen and clergy alike engaging in missionary activity.

An early third-century Syriac work known as the Acts of Thomas connects the apostle's Indian ministry with two kings, one in the north and the other in the south. According to the Acts, Thomas was at first reluctant to accept this mission, but the Lord appeared to him in a night vision and compelled him to accompany an Indian merchant, Abbanes (or Habban), to his native place in northwest India. There, Thomas found himself in the service of the Indo-Parthian King, Gondophares. The Apostle's ministry resulted in many conversions throughout the kingdom, including the king and his brother.

Thomas thereafter went south to Kerala and baptized the natives, whose descendants form the Saint Thomas Christians or the Syrian Malabar Nasranis.

Piecing together the various traditions, the story suggests that Thomas left northwest India when invasion threatened, and traveled by vessel to the Malabar Coast along the southwestern coast of the Indian continent, possibly visiting southeast Arabia and Socotra en route, and landing at the former flourishing port of Muziris on an island near Cochin in 52.   From there he preached the gospel throughout the Malabar Coast. The various churches he founded were located mainly on the Periyar River and its tributaries and along the coast. He preached to all classes of people and had about 170 converts, including members of the four principal castes. Later, stone crosses were erected at the places where churches were founded, and they became pilgrimage centres. In accordance with apostolic custom, Thomas ordained teachers and leaders or elders, who were reported to be the earliest ministry of the Malabar church.

Thomas next proceeded overland to the Coromandel Coast in southeastern India, and ministered in what is now Chennai (earlier Madras), where a local king and many people were converted. One tradition related that he went from there to China via Malacca in Malaysia, and after spending some time there, returned to the Chennai area. Apparently his renewed ministry outraged the Brahmins, who were fearful lest Christianity undermine their social caste system. So according to the Syriac version of the Acts of Thomas, Mazdai, the local king at Mylapore, after questioning the Apostle condemned him to death about the year AD 72. Anxious to avoid popular excitement, the King ordered Thomas conducted to a nearby mountain, where, after being allowed to pray, he was then stoned and stabbed to death with a lance wielded by an angry Brahmin.

Mesopotamia and the Parthian Empire
Edessa, which was held by Rome from 116 to 118 and 212 to 214, but was mostly a client kingdom associated either with Rome or Persia, was an important Christian city. Shortly after 201 or even earlier, its royal house became Christian.

Edessa (now Şanlıurfa) in northwestern Mesopotamia was from apostolic times the principal center of Syriac-speaking Christianity. it was the capital of an independent kingdom from 132 BC to AD 216, when it became tributary to Rome. Celebrated as an important centre of Greco-Syrian culture, Edessa was also noted for its Jewish community, with proselytes in the royal family. Strategically located on the main trade routes of the Fertile Crescent, it was easily accessible from Antioch, where the mission to the Gentiles was inaugurated. When early Christians were scattered abroad because of persecution, some found refuge at Edessa. Thus the Edessan church traced its origin to the Apostolic Age (which may account for its rapid growth), and Christianity even became the state religion for a time.

The Church of the East had its inception at a very early date in the buffer zone between the Parthian and Roman Empires in Upper Mesopotamia, known as the Assyrian Church of the East. The vicissitudes of its later growth were rooted in its minority status in a situation of international tension. The rulers of the Parthian Empire (250 BC – AD 226) were on the whole tolerant in spirit, and with the older faiths of Babylonia and Assyria in a state of decay, the time was ripe for a new and vital faith. The rulers of the Second Persian empire (226–640) also followed a policy of religious toleration to begin with, though later they gave Christians the same status as a subject race. However, these rulers also encouraged the revival of the ancient Persian dualistic faith of Zoroastrianism and established it as the state religion, with the result that the Christians were increasingly subjected to repressive measures. Nevertheless, it was not until Christianity became the state religion in the West (380) that enmity toward Rome was focused on the Eastern Christians. After the Muslim conquest in the 7th century, the caliphate tolerated other faiths but forbade proselytism and subjected Christians to heavy taxation.

The missionary Addai evangelized Mesopotamia (modern Iraq) about the middle of the 2nd century. An ancient legend recorded by Eusebius (AD 260–340) and also found in the Doctrine of Addai (c. AD 400) (from information in the royal archives of Edessa) describes how King Abgar V of Edessa communicated to Jesus, requesting he come and heal him, to which appeal he received a reply. It is said that after the resurrection, Thomas sent Addai (or Thaddaeus), to the king, with the result that the city was won to the Christian faith. In this mission he was accompanied by a disciple, Mari, and the two are regarded as co-founders of the church, according to the Liturgy of Addai and Mari (c. AD 200), which is still the normal liturgy of the Assyrian church. The Doctrine of Addai further states that Thomas was regarded as an apostle of the church in Edessa.

Addai, who became the first bishop of Edessa, was succeeded by Aggai, then by Palut, who was ordained about 200 by Serapion of Antioch. Thence came to us in the 2nd century the famous Peshitta, or Syriac translation of the Old Testament; also Tatian's Diatessaron, which was compiled about 172 and in common use until St. Rabbula, Bishop of Edessa (412–435), forbade its use. This arrangement of the four canonical gospels as a continuous narrative, whose original language may have been Syriac, Greek, or even Latin, circulated widely in Syriac-speaking Churches.

A Christian council was held at Edessa as early as 197. In 201 the city was devastated by a great flood, and the Christian church was destroyed. In 232, the Syriac Acts were written supposedly on the event of the relics of the Apostle Thomas being handed to the church in Edessa. Under Roman domination many martyrs suffered at Edessa: Sts. Scharbîl and Barsamya, under Decius; Sts. Gûrja, Schâmôna, Habib, and others under Diocletian. In the meanwhile Christian priests from Edessa had evangelized Eastern Mesopotamia and Persia, and established the first churches in the kingdom of the Sasanians. Atillâtiâ, Bishop of Edessa, assisted at the First Council of Nicaea (325).

Persia and Central Asia
By the latter half of the 2nd century, Christianity had spread east throughout Media, Persia, Parthia, and Bactria. The twenty bishops and many presbyters were more of the order of itinerant missionaries, passing from place to place as Paul did and supplying their needs with such occupations as merchant or craftsman. By AD 280 the metropolis of Seleucia assumed the title of "Catholicos" and in AD 424 a council of the church at Seleucia elected the first patriarch to have jurisdiction over the whole church of the East. The seat of the Patriarchate was fixed at Seleucia-Ctesiphon, since this was an important point on the East-West trade routes which extended both to India and China, Java and Japan. Thus the shift of ecclesiastical authority was away from Edessa, which in AD 216 had become tributary to Rome. the establishment of an independent patriarchate with nine subordinate metropoli contributed to a more favourable attitude by the Persian government, which no longer had to fear an ecclesiastical alliance with the common enemy, Rome.

By the time that Edessa was incorporated into the Persian Empire in 258, the city of Arbela, situated on the Tigris in what is now Iraq, had taken on more and more the role that Edessa had played in the early years, as a centre from which Christianity spread to the rest of the Persian Empire.

Bardaisan, writing about 196, speaks of Christians throughout Media, Parthia and Bactria (modern-day Afghanistan) and, according to Tertullian (c. 160–230), there were already a number of bishoprics within the Persian Empire by 220. By 315, the bishop of Seleucia–Ctesiphon had assumed the title "Catholicos". By this time, neither Edessa nor Arbela was the centre of the Church of the East anymore; ecclesiastical authority had moved east to the heart of the Persian Empire. The twin cities of Seleucia-Ctesiphon, well-situated on the main trade routes between East and West, became, in the words of John Stewart, "a magnificent centre for the missionary church that was entering on its great task of carrying the gospel to the far east".

During the reign of Shapur II of the Sasanian Empire, he was not initially hostile to his Christian subjects, who were led by Shemon Bar Sabbae, the Patriarch of the Church of the East, however, the conversion of Constantine the Great to Christianity caused Shapur to start distrusting his Christian subjects. He started seeing them as agents of a foreign enemy. The wars between the Sasanian and Roman empires turned Shapur's mistrust into hostility. After the death of Constantine, Shapur II, who had been preparing for a war against the Romans for several years, imposed a double tax on his Christian subjects to finance the conflict. Shemon, however, refused to pay the double tax. Shapur started pressuring Shemon and his clergy to convert to Zoroastrianism, which they refused to do. It was during this period the 'cycle of the martyrs' began during which 'many thousands of Christians' were put to death. During the following years, Shemon's successors, Shahdost and Barba'shmin, were also martyred.

A near-contemporary 5th-century Christian work, the Ecclesiastical History of Sozomen, contains considerable detail on the Persian Christians martyred under Shapur II. Sozomen estimates the total number of Christians killed as follows:

Arabian Peninsula

To understand the penetration of the Arabian peninsula by the Christian gospel, it is helpful to distinguish between the Bedouin nomads of the interior, who were chiefly herdsmen and unreceptive to foreign control, and the inhabitants of the settled communities of the coastal areas and oases, who were either middlemen traders or farmers and were receptive to influences from abroad. Christianity apparently gained its strongest foothold in the ancient center of Semitic civilization in South-west Arabia or Yemen (sometimes known as Seba or Sheba, whose queen visited Solomon). Because of geographic proximity, acculturation with Ethiopia was always strong, and the royal family traces its ancestry to this queen.

The presence of Arabians at Pentecost and Paul's three-year sojourn in Arabia suggest a very early gospel witness. A 4th-century church history, states that the apostle Bartholomew preached in Arabia and that Himyarites were among his converts. The Al-Jubail Church in what is now Saudi Arabia was built in the 4th century. Arabia's close relations with Ethiopia give significance to the conversion of the treasurer to the queen of Ethiopia, not to mention the tradition that the Apostle Matthew was assigned to this land. Eusebius says that "one Pantaneous (c. A.D. 190) was sent from Alexandria as a missionary to the nations of the East", including southwest Arabia, on his way to India.

Nubia
Christianity arrived early in Nubia. In the New Testament of the Christian Bible, a treasury official of "Candace, queen of the Ethiopians" returning from a trip to Jerusalem was baptised by Philip the Evangelist:

 Then the Angel of the Lord said to Philip, Start out and go south to the road that leads down from Jerusalem to Gaza, which is desert. And he arose and went: And behold, a man of Ethiopia, an Eunuch of great authority under Candace, Queen of E-thi-o'pi-ans, who had the charge of all her treasure, and had come to Jerusalem to worship.

Ethiopia at that time meant any upper Nile region. Candace was the name and perhaps, title for the Meroë or Kushite queens.

In the fourth century, bishop Athanasius of Alexandria consecrated  Marcus as bishop of Philae before his death in 373, showing that Christianity had permanently penetrated the region. John of Ephesus records that a Monophysite priest named Julian converted the king and his nobles of Nobatia around 545 and another kingdom of Alodia converted around 569. By the 7th century Makuria expanded becoming the dominant power in the region so strong enough to halt the southern expansion of Islam after the Arabs had taken Egypt.  After several failed invasions the new rulers agreed to a treaty with Dongola allowing for peaceful coexistence and trade.  This treaty held for six hundred years allowing Arab traders introducing Islam to Nubia and it gradually supplanted Christianity.  The last recorded bishop was Timothy at Qasr Ibrim in 1372.

See also
 Christianity in the 1st century
 Christianity in the 2nd century
 Christianity in the 3rd century
 Early Christian art and architecture
 History of Christianity

References

Bibliography
 Dunn, James D.G. Jews and Christians: The Parting of the Ways, AD 70 to 135. Pp 33–34. Wm. B. Eerdmans Publishing (1999). .
 Esler, Philip F. The Early Christian World. Routledge (2004). .
 Pelikan, Jaroslav Jan. The Christian Tradition: The Emergence of the Catholic Tradition (100–600). University of Chicago Press (1975). .
 Stark, Rodney.The Rise of Christianity. Harper Collins Pbk. Ed edition 1997. 
 Taylor, Joan E. Christians and the Holy Places: The Myth of Jewish-Christian Origins. Oxford University Press (1993). .
 Thiede, Carsten Peter. The Dead Sea Scrolls and the Jewish Origins of Christianity. Palgrabe Macmillan (2003). .

External links
Early Christians (archived 1 September 2014)
PBS Frontline: The First Christians
First Christians and Rome
Cave in Jordan Said to Have Been Used by Early Christians Biblical Archaeology Review (archived 7 January 2010)

1st-century Christianity
2nd-century Christianity
3rd-century Christianity
4th-century Christianity